Esporte Clube Internacional, commonly known as Internacional de Lages or Inter de Lages, is a Brazilian football team based in Lages, Santa Catarina state. In 2021, it plays Campeonato Catarinense Série B, the state of Santa Catarina's second league.

History
The club was founded on June 13, 1949. It won the Campeonato Catarinense in 1965, the Campeonato Catarinense Second Level in 1990, 2000 and 2014 and the Campeonato Catarinense Third Level in 2013. Inter de Lages played the Taça Brasil in 1966, when it was eliminated in the first stage by Ferroviário-PR. The club returned to the national competitions in 2015, when it played the Campeonato Brasileiro Série D, the fourth tier of the Brazilian football.

Current squad

Staff

Achievements

 Campeonato Catarinense:
 Winners (1): 1965
 Campeonato Catarinense Second Level:
 Winners (3): 1990, 2000, 2014
 Campeonato Catarinense Third Level:
 Winners (1): 2013

Stadium
Esporte Clube Internacional plays its home games at Estádio Vidal Ramos Júnior. The stadium used to have a maximum capacity of 11,800 people, but, following new security patterns, its capacity was lowered to 9,600 people.

References

External links

Association football clubs established in 1949
Football clubs in Santa Catarina (state)
1949 establishments in Brazil